Julian Edwin "Cannonball" Adderley (September 15, 1928August 8, 1975) was an American jazz alto saxophonist of the hard bop era of the 1950s and 1960s.

Adderley is perhaps best remembered for the 1966 soul jazz single "Mercy, Mercy, Mercy", which was written for him by his keyboardist Joe Zawinul and became a major crossover hit on the pop and R&B charts. A cover version by the Buckinghams, who added lyrics, also reached No. 5 on the charts. Adderley worked with Miles Davis, first as a member of the Davis sextet, appearing on the seminal records Milestones (1958) and Kind of Blue (1959), and then on his own 1958 album Somethin' Else. He was the elder brother of jazz trumpeter Nat Adderley, who was a longtime member of his band.

Early life and career
Julian Edwin Adderley was born on September 15, 1928, in Tampa, Florida to high school guidance counselor and cornet player Julian Carlyle Adderley and elementary school teacher Jessie Johnson. Elementary school classmates called him "cannonball" (i.e., "cannibal") after his voracious appetite.

Cannonball moved to Tallahassee when his parents obtained teaching positions at Florida A&M University. Both Cannonball and brother Nat played with Ray Charles when Charles lived in Tallahassee during the early 1940s. Adderley moved to Broward County, Florida, in 1948 after finishing his music studies at Florida A&M and became the band director at Dillard High School in Fort Lauderdale, a position which he held until 1950.

Cannonball left Southeast Florida and moved to New York City in 1955. One of his known addresses in New York was in the neighborhood of Corona, Queens. He left Florida originally to seek graduate studies at New York conservatories, but one night in 1955 he brought his saxophone with him to the Café Bohemia. Cannonball was asked to sit in with Oscar Pettiford in place of his band's regular saxophonist, who was late for the gig. The "buzz" on the New York jazz scene after Adderley's performance announced him as the heir to the mantle of Charlie Parker.

Adderley formed his own group with his brother Nat after signing onto the Savoy jazz label in 1955.  He was noticed by Miles Davis, and it was because of his blues-rooted alto saxophone that Davis asked him to play with his group. He joined the Davis band in October 1957, three months prior to the return of John Coltrane to the group. Some of Davis's finest trumpet work can be found on Adderley's solo album Somethin' Else (also featuring Art Blakey and Hank Jones), which was recorded shortly after the two giants met. Adderley then played on the seminal Davis records Milestones and Kind of Blue.  This period also overlapped with pianist Bill Evans' time with the sextet, an association that led to Evans appearing on Portrait of Cannonball and Know What I Mean?.

His interest as an educator carried over to his recordings. In 1961, Cannonball narrated The Child's Introduction to Jazz, released on Riverside Records. In 1962, Cannonball married actress Olga James.

Band leader
The Cannonball Adderley Quintet featured Cannonball on alto sax and his brother Nat Adderley on cornet. Cannonball's first quintet was not very successful; however, after leaving Davis' group, he formed another group again with his brother. 
The new quintet, which later became the Cannonball Adderley Sextet, and Cannonball's other combos and groups, included such noted musicians as saxophonists Charles Lloyd and Yusef Lateef, pianists Bobby Timmons, Barry Harris, Victor Feldman, Joe Zawinul, Hal Galper, Michael Wolff, and George Duke, bassists Ray Brown, Sam Jones, Walter Booker, and Victor Gaskin, and drummers Louis Hayes and Roy McCurdy.

Later life

By the end of the 1960s, Adderley's playing began to reflect the influence of electric jazz. In this period, he released albums such as Accent on Africa (1968) and The Price You Got to Pay to Be Free (1970). In that same year, his quintet appeared at the Monterey Jazz Festival in California, and a brief scene of that performance was featured in the 1971 psychological thriller Play Misty for Me, starring Clint Eastwood. In 1975 he also appeared in an acting role alongside José Feliciano and David Carradine in the episode "Battle Hymn" in the third season of the TV series Kung Fu.

Songs made famous by Adderley and his bands include "This Here" (written by Bobby Timmons), "The Jive Samba", "Work Song" (written by Nat Adderley), "Mercy, Mercy, Mercy" (written by Joe Zawinul) and "Walk Tall"  (written by Zawinul, Marrow, and Rein). A cover version of Pops Staples' "Why (Am I Treated So Bad)?" also entered the charts. His instrumental "Sack o' Woe" was arranged by Herbie Mann on their debut album.

In July 1975, Adderley suffered a stroke from a cerebral hemorrhage and died four weeks later, on August 8, 1975, at St. Mary Methodist Hospital in Gary, Indiana. He was 46 years old. He was survived by his wife Olga James Adderley, parents Julian C. and Jessie L. Adderley, and brother Nat Adderley. He was buried in the Southside Cemetery, Tallahassee.

Legacy
Later in 1975, he was inducted into the DownBeat Jazz Hall of Fame. Joe Zawinul's composition "Cannon Ball" on Weather Report's Black Market album is a tribute to his former leader. Pepper Adams and George Mraz dedicated the composition "Julian" on the 1975 Pepper Adams album of the same name days after Cannonball's death.

Adderley was initiated as an honorary member of Phi Mu Alpha Sinfonia fraternity (Gamma Theta chapter, University of North Texas, '60, and Xi Omega chapter, Frostburg State University, '70) and Alpha Phi Alpha (Beta Nu chapter, Florida A&M University).

Discography

References

External links

Cannonball Adderley at NPR Music
The Cannonball Adderley Rendez-vous

African-American jazz musicians
African-American woodwind musicians
American jazz bandleaders
American jazz alto saxophonists
American male saxophonists
Hard bop saxophonists
Jazz alto saxophonists
Jazz record producers
Soul-jazz saxophonists
1928 births
1975 deaths
Miles Davis Quintet members
Capitol Records artists
EmArcy Records artists
Blue Note Records artists
Savoy Records artists
Riverside Records artists
Landmark Records artists
Fantasy Records artists
Milestone Records artists
Verve Records artists
20th-century American musicians
United States Army Band musicians
20th-century saxophonists
American male jazz musicians
Cannonball Adderley Quintet members
20th-century American male musicians
Musicians from Tampa, Florida